Ostericum is a genus of flowering plants belonging to the family Apiaceae.

Its native range is Temperate Eurasia.

Species:

Ostericum atropurpureum 
Ostericum citriodorum 
Ostericum florenti 
Ostericum grosseserratum 
Ostericum huadongense 
Ostericum longipedicellatum 
Ostericum maximowiczii 
Ostericum palustre 
Ostericum scaberulum 
Ostericum sieboldii 
Ostericum tenuifolium

References

Apioideae
Apioideae genera